Adriano Tancon (born 18 November 1958) is an Italian ice hockey player. He competed in the men's tournament at the 1984 Winter Olympics.

References

External links
 

1958 births
Living people
Olympic ice hockey players of Italy
Ice hockey players at the 1984 Winter Olympics
People from Canale d'Agordo
Sportspeople from the Province of Belluno